Donald Aaron Baer (born September 17, 1954) is an American who has worked as a media lawyer, journalist, and a senior advisor to then-president Bill Clinton who was formerly Chairman of Burson Cohn & Wolfe. He was formerly the Worldwide Chair and CEO of Burson-Marsteller, a public relations firm, and is the current Chairman of the Board of PBS. Baer received his undergraduate education at the University of North Carolina at Chapel Hill, a masters in international relations at the London School of Economics, and a J.D. degree from the University of Virginia School of Law. He and his wife, Nancy Bard, wed in 1987.

References

External links 
Bio from Politico

1954 births
Living people
American chief executives
American male journalists
American lawyers
Clinton administration personnel
University of North Carolina at Chapel Hill alumni
University of Virginia School of Law alumni